The men's team sprint was held on 21 October 2011, with 10 teams participating.

Medalists

Results

Qualifying
The fastest two teams race for gold and 3rd and 4th teams race for bronze. It was held at 16:00.

Finals
The final was held at 20:52.

References

2011 European Track Championships
European Track Championships – Men's team sprint